Jewell Meadows Wildlife Area is an American wildlife refuge located in northwest Oregon, near the community of Jewell. The area is designed to benefit native wildlife and to reduce the impact of wild animal populations on area properties. The refuge was  when the area was established in 1969.

During the winter and spring months, up to 200 elk may be seen from an adjacent highway. Hunting is prohibited and there is no public access to the main meadow. There are parking areas and four viewing areas on site, along with some affiliated signage.

Bird watching is common all year with bird species varying with the time of year. Bald eagles, red-tailed hawks, many owl species and over 40 songbird species spend time in the area. Other wildlife includes coyotes, bobcats, black-tailed deer, river otters and beavers.

See also 
 Fishhawk Falls

References 

Protected areas of Columbia County, Oregon
1969 establishments in Oregon
Nature reserves in Oregon
Meadows in the United States
Oregon state wildlife areas
Protected areas established in 1969